Combined is an event in alpine ski racing. The event format has changed within the last 30 years.  A traditional combined competition is a two-day event consisting of one run of downhill and two runs of slalom; each discipline takes place on a separate day. The winner is the skier with the fastest aggregate time. Until the 1990s, a complicated point system was used to determine placings in the combined event. Since then, a modified version, called either a "super combined" (with a downhill as the speed event) or an "Alpine combined" (with a Super-G as the speed event), has been run as an aggregate time event consisting of two runs: first, a one-run speed event and then only one run of slalom, with both portions held on the same day.

History
The first Alpine World Ski Championships in 1931 did not include the combined event, but it was added to the program in 1932. Alpine skiing at the Winter Olympics was not included until 1936, and the combined was the only event. The combined was one of three medal events at the next Olympics in 1948, along with downhill and slalom. The combined used the results of the only downhill race with two runs of combined slalom. The regular slalom (two runs) was held the following day.

With the introduction of giant slalom at the world championships in 1950, the combined event disappeared from the Olympics for four decades, until re-introduced in 1988. From 1948 through 1980, the Winter Olympics also served as the world championships, with two sets of medals awarded. The world champion in the combined was determined "on paper" by the results of the three races of downhill, giant slalom, and slalom.  The top three finishers in the combined event were awarded world championship medals by the FIS, but not Olympic medals from the IOC. This three-race paper method was used from 1954 through 1980; no FIS medals were awarded for the combined in 1950 or 1952. A separate downhill and slalom for the combined event was added to the world championships in 1982, and the Olympics in 1988.

The world championships were held annually from 1931 through 1939, were interrupted by World War II, and resumed as a biennial event at the 1948 Olympics, held in even-numbered years through 1982. They skipped the 1984 Olympics and have been scheduled for odd-numbered years since 1985. (The 1995 event was postponed to 1996, due to lack of snow in southeastern Spain.)

At the Winter Olympics and world championships, the slalom and downhill portions of a combined event are run separately from the regular downhill and slalom events on shorter, and often less demanding, race courses. On the World Cup circuit, traditional combined events have been "paper races," combining skiers' times from a separately scheduled downhill race and slalom race, generally held at the same location over two days. In 2005, the FIS began to replace these "calculated" combineds with super combined events, held on one day, which administrators hope will result in increased participation.

Recent modifications
A modified version, the super combined or Alpine combined, is a speed race (downhill or super-G) and only one run of slalom, with both portions scheduled on the same day. Because slalom courses generally become slower after the first racers, recent changes to the super combined or Alpine combined events have the fastest racers from the speed race start first in the slalom run, which is a revision to the prior structure of starting the slalom run in reverse order, as is done in the second run of a traditional two-run slalom.

World Cup
The first super combined was a World Cup race held in 2005 in Wengen, Switzerland, on January 14; Benjamin Raich of Austria was the winner. The first women's race in the new format was run six weeks later in San Sicario, Italy; won by Croatia's Janica Kostelić on February 27. The 2006 World Cup calendar included three super combineds and just one traditional combined race on the men's side, while the women raced two super combineds and no traditional combineds. Kostelić won the first three women's World Cup super combineds.

Beginning with the 2007 season, the FIS began awarding a fifth discipline-champion "crystal globe" to the points winner of combined races; the 2007 season included five combined races for each gender. Nine out of the ten scheduled combineds use the new super-combined format, the only exception was Kitzbühel, Austria, which continued with the traditional two-run format (K), albeit in a "paper race." The change to super combined expectedly resulted in major disapproval from the slalom specialists, the loudest critic being Ivica Kostelić. Even with the change to a single slalom run, many speed skiers believe the technical racers have the advantage in the super combined.

World Championships and Winter Olympics
The super combined format debuted at the world championships in 2007 in Åre, Sweden, and at the Winter Olympics in 2010 at Whistler, Canada.

Men's World Cup podiums
In the following table men's combined (super combined from 2007) World Cup podiums in the World Cup since first edition in 1976.

References

Combined
Combination events